St John the Baptist's Church is in the village of Bretherton, Lancashire, England. It is an active Anglican parish church in the deanery of Chorley, the archdeaconry of Blackburn and the diocese of Blackburn. Its benefice is united with that of St Michael and All Angels, Croston. The church is recorded in the National Heritage List for England as a designated Grade II listed building. It was a Commissioners' church, having received a grant towards its construction from the Church Building Commission.

History

St John's was a Commissioners' church costing £1,058 (equivalent to £ in ).  The Church Building Commission contributed £250 towards its cost.  It was designed by the Lancaster architect Edmund Sharpe and built in 1839–40.  The land was given by George Arthur Legh Keck. The church provided seating for 400 people.  In July 1840 it was consecrated by Rt Revd John Bird Sumner, at that time the Bishop of Chester.  The church was restored in 1898 by Sharpe's successors Austin and Paley, who also added a chancel and vestry in 1908–09. In September 2009 the church was damaged by fire caused by an arsonist.

Architecture

The church is constructed in sandstone with slate roofs. Its plan consists of a five-bay nave incorporating a south porch, and a two-bay chancel under a higher roof. The style of the nave is "simple Gothic", while that of the chancel is Perpendicular. At the west end is a slender tower, the lowest stage of which constitutes a porch that is open on three sides. Above this are three string courses, the top one of which is stepped over the bell opening. At the corners are buttresses that rise to form crocketted pinnacles. At the top of the tower between the pinnacles is a stepped parapet. A slim octagonal spire rises from the tower. The porch has an arched doorway over which is a lancet window. Its top is gabled and has a cross finial. The east window has five lights and Perpendicular tracery. Inside the church is a west gallery supported on four slim iron columns. The two-manual organ was built by Ainscough Organ Builders of Preston in 1929, and rebuilt and extended by David Wells of Liverpool in 2000.

External features

The churchyard contains the war grave of a Loyal Regiment soldier of World War I.

See also

Listed buildings in Bretherton
List of architectural works by Edmund Sharpe
List of ecclesiastical works by Austin and Paley (1895–1914)
List of Commissioners' churches in Northeast and Northwest England

Gallery

References

Citations

Sources

Church of England church buildings in Lancashire
Grade II listed churches in Lancashire
Gothic Revival church buildings in England
Gothic Revival architecture in Lancashire
Churches completed in 1909
19th-century Church of England church buildings
Diocese of Blackburn
Edmund Sharpe buildings
Austin and Paley buildings
Commissioners' church buildings
John, Bretherton
Religious buildings and structures in the United Kingdom destroyed by arson